Rixi may refer to:

 Rixi Markus (1910–1992), Austrian/British bridge player
 Edoardo Rixi (born 1974), Italian politician
 The Day the Sun Died (pinyin: Rìxī), a 2015 novel by Yan Lianke